Willesden East was a constituency in Middlesex adjoining the County of London and forming part of the London conurbation, in London itself from 1965. It returned one member to the House of Commons of the UK Parliament 1918 – 1974.

The outcome of the seat was a bellwether of the national outcome from 1931 until its abolition.  Before 1945 the seats electorate had not elected any Labour candidate, however had sided overall with the Liberal candidate once, in 1923, in a by-election.

Boundaries
1918–1950: The Urban District of Willesden wards of Brondesbury Park, Cricklewood, Kensal Rise, Mid Kilburn, North Kilburn, and South Kilburn.

1950–1974: The Municipal Borough of Willesden wards of Brondesbury Park, Carlton, Cricklewood, Kilburn, Mapesbury, and Neasden.

Members of Parliament

Elections

Elections in the 1910s

Elections in the 1920s

Elections in the 1930s

Elections in the 1940s 
General Election 1939–40:

Another General Election was required to take place before the end of 1940. The political parties had been making preparations for an election to take place from 1939 and by the end of this year, the following candidates had been selected; 
Conservative: Samuel Hammersley
Labour: Maurice Orbach
Liberal: Arthur Shenfield

Elections in the 1950s

Elections in the 1960s

Elections in the 1970s

References

Parliamentary constituencies in London (historic)
Constituencies of the Parliament of the United Kingdom established in 1918
Constituencies of the Parliament of the United Kingdom disestablished in 1974
Politics of the London Borough of Brent
Willesden